Middleton is a city in Dane County, Wisconsin, United States, and a suburb of the state capital, Madison. Middleton's motto is "The Good Neighbor City." The population was 21,827 at the 2020 census.

History
The first settlers were mostly of English descent, and they came to Middleton in the 1840s. It was called Peatville for the large quantities of peat extracted from its soil. The village was renamed Middleton when it was separated from the town of Madison in 1848. Many German settlers arrived to Middleton in the 1850s, and after the year 1880, the population was largely of German descent. The first Lutheran Church was founded in the area in 1952.

Middleton incorporated as a village in 1905 and it became a city in 1963. At the suggestion of its first postmaster, Harry Barnes, it was named after a community in Vermont.

Geography 
Middleton is located about 6 miles West/Northwest of Madison, the capital of the U.S. state of Wisconsin.

Climate

Demographics 

Since 1990 there has been a population increase of over 20% in the Madison metropolitan area. This has led to Middleton being considered as the western hub of a proposed, albeit controversial,  railroad corridor connecting Middleton's Greenway Station, the University of Wisconsin–Madison campus, downtown Madison, and Madison's far east side.

2010 census 
As of the census of 2010, there were 17,442 people, 8,037 households, and 4,453 families residing in the city. The racial makeup of the city was 87.1% White, 3.5% African American, 0.3% Native American, 4.2% Asian, 2.3% from other races, and 2.5% from two or more races. Hispanic or Latino of any race were 5.6% of the population.

There were 8,037 households, of which 26.7% had children under the age of 18 living with them, 43.6% were married couples living together, 8.7% had a female householder with no husband present, 3.0% had a male householder with no wife present, and 44.6% were non-families. 36.0% of all households were made up of individuals, and 9.4% had someone living alone who was 65 years of age or older. The average household size was 2.16 and the average family size was 2.86.

The median age in the city was 39.1 years. 21.8% of residents were under the age of 18; 7.5% were between the ages of 18 and 24; 29.1% were from 25 to 44; 29.3% were from 45 to 64; and 12.3% were 65 years of age or older. The gender makeup of the city was 48.3% male and 51.7% female.

2000 census 
As of the census in 2000, there were 15,770 people living in Middleton, although in 2006 that number was estimated to be as high as 16,595. The population density was 1,953.2 people per square mile (754.5/km2). There were 7,397 housing units at an average density of 916.2 per square mile (353.9/km2). The racial makeup of the city was 92.08% White, 1.97% Black or African American, 0.45% Native American, 2.66% Asian, 0.03% Pacific Islander, 1.27% from other races, and 1.54% from two or more races. 2.82% of the population were Hispanic or Latino of any race.

According to the census, there were 7,095 households in Middleton, out of which 27.9% had children under the age of 18 living with them, 45.5% were married couples living together, 8.1% had a female householder with no husband present, and 43.9% were non-families. 34.5% of all households were made up of individuals, and 7.2% had someone living alone who was 65 years of age or older. The average household size was 2.21 and the average family size was 2.90.

The age of the population of Middleton is fairly diverse. The census states that 22.7% of the citizens there were under the age of 18, 8.7% from 18 to 24, 33.1% from 25 to 44, 25.2% from 45 to 64, and 10.3% who were 65 years of age or older. The median age was 36 years. For every 100 females, there were 92.1 males. For every 100 females age 18 and over, there were 88.6 males.

The median income for a household in the city was $50,786, and the median income for a family was $71,514. Males had a median income of $41,070 versus $30,928 for females. The per capita income for the city was $29,464. About 3.1% of families and 5.0% of the population were below the poverty line, including 7.2% of those under age 18 and 2.8% of those age 65 or over.

Economy

Business 
The largest industry sector in Middleton is manufacturing. Other major job sectors are retail trade, technology, educational services, health care, management of companies, finance and accommodations. In 2019, 17% of workers were employed in the manufacturing sector with 3,037 jobs. As of 2016, over 65% of Middleton residents have associate, bachelors or advanced degrees and 44.7% of residents are employed in positions which earn more than $75,000 per year. Over 2,000 companies are located in Middleton, including American Girl's corporate headquarters and one of Electronic Theater Controls' worldwide offices.

Top employers 
As of 2019 the top employers in the city are:

Tourism and shopping

Greenway Station is a shopping mall opened in 2003. Downtown Middleton has several shops and restaurants. During the 1960s and early 1970s, the Nitty Gritty restaurant in Middleton featured live blues music, and featured B.B. King, Muddy Waters, Charlie Musselwhite, and Cheap Trick. In 1985, the Nitty Gritty was re-branded as a birthday destination, and as of 2018, over 725,000 birthdays have been celebrated there.

Arts and culture

Events 
Middleton has an annual Middleton Good Neighbor Festival held on the last weekend of August at Firemen's Park in Middleton. The festival has been held since 1964, and "The Good Neighbor Award" has been awarded to a Middleton resident since 1980. The award is given to individuals who have made a difference in the community, and embody what it means to be a Good Neighbor. The three-day festival has free live music, carnival rides, family activities, entertainment, food, parades and other activities.

Sunflower Days is typically a 10-day event Pope Farm Conservancy held between July and August which features 9.5 acres of sunflowers. The event was attended by 90,000 people in 2017. There is no parking at Pope Farm Conservancy and the Sunflower Shuttle runs every 30 minutes.

National Mustard Day is an outdoor food festival held annually on the first Saturday of August in downtown Middleton. The event features live music, face painting, games and entertainment, food and free mustard samplings. National Mustard Museum has hosted and sponsored the event since 1991.

Downtown Middleton Summer Fun series is typically held from July to August, and it features free music and entertainment on every Thursday. In 2021, the event included arts and crafts table for children, picnic tables, hula hoops, free beginner harmonica lessons and other activities.

Haunted Hustle is a Halloween-themed marathon held in October. Other events in Middleton include Wine Walk, Greenway Station Farmers' Market and Prairie Chase Run/Walk. Middleton-Cross Plains Area Performing Arts Center hosts plays and dances.

Art 
Middleton is dedicated to providing and encouraging outdoor public art, including sculptures, murals and stained glass. Visit Middleton's website offers a Middleton's Outdoor Public Art Trail map. Middleton Arts Committee and the Middleton Community Development Authority sponsors and supports art in Middleton.

Parks and recreation
Middleton has a golf course, Pleasant View Golf Course, located near Lake Mendota. Skiing, biking and hiking trails are also available in the area. Pleasant View Golf Course has been named the "Best Golf Course in Madison Area" four times (2016, 2018, 2019 and 2020) by Madison magazine. Walter. R. Bauman Aquatic Center is an outdoor facility that offers pools, waterslides, playground and water equipment.

Lake Mendota is a popular attraction among tourists and residents as it offers a variety of outdoor activities such as fishing, swimming, and other aquatic pursuits. Middleton has a skate park, Quarry Skate Park and board and boats rental company, Marshall Boats. Lake Mendota County Park offers a campground, picnic area, volleyball courts, and swimming.

Education 
Middleton belongs to the Middleton-Cross Plains School District. There are seven elementary schools, two middle schools, one high school and one alternative senior high school in the district. Recently, students in Blackhawk Middleton have been moved from Glacier Creek to Kromery.

Students attend either Middleton High School or Clark Street Community School. In 2021, in a report by U.S. News & World Report, Middleton High School was named as the best high school in Dane County and it was also named 11th best high school out of around 540 in the state of Wisconsin. The report indicated that the graduation rate at Middleton High School was 96%, and more than half of students took at least one Advanced Placement exam.

Elementary schools 

 Elm Lawn Elementary School
 Park Elementary School
 Pope Farm Elementary School
 Northside Elementary School
 Sauk Trail Elementary School
 Sunset Ridge Elementary School
 West Middleton Elementary School

Middle schools 

 Glacier Creek Middle School
 Kromrey Middle School

High schools 

 Middleton High School
 Clark Street Community School

Media 
Middleton is served by Madison TV, radio, print, and other media. The Middleton Times-Tribune is a weekly community newspaper. The Middleton Review is a free community newspaper that serves the city. Middleton also serves as the community of license for several Madison based stations including country music outlet 106.3 WWQM and DTV America television station WZCK channel 8 which is dual licensed to Middleton and Madison. 97.3 W247CI an FM translator of Catholic station WHFA also broadcasts from the city on a transmitter above the Wisconsin Trade Center.

Attractions 

Middleton is the home of the National Mustard Museum. It is often featured in lists of unusual museums in the United States. It was originally located in the nearby town of Mount Horeb, Wisconsin, but moved to Middleton. The museum and its curator were featured on National Public Radio's Morning Edition broadcast of July 29, 2010, and Weekend Edition Saturday on February 18, 1995 (when it was located in Mount Horeb). Middleton's second museum, Middleton Historical Museum (also known as Rowley House) offers information and donations by early settlers. Middleton Train Depot was built in 1856. It was an active passenger station until 1960 and a freight depot until 1975. It is listed on the National Register of Historic Places and serves as a visitor's center.

The Pheasant Branch Creek Conservancy is a nature preserve of green space and wetland with prairie hills, natural springs, and Native American burial mounds. The creek drains on the east into Lake Mendota, and a hiking trail follows beside it through a forest, passing beside Parisi Park. The Pope Farm Conservancy, opened to visitors in 2006, is a park and a nature area with walking trails, wildlife, sunflower fields, prairie and savanna restoration areas.

Wisconsin Trade Center is a commercial office building made of blue glass windows and it is the tallest building in Middleton.  Middleton has a garden and landscaping center called Orchids Garden Centre & Nursery.

Capital Brewery was founded in 1984 to brew German-style lager beer and has since branched to American-style ales and barrel-aged beers. Capital Brewery has won over 240 awards. The Capital Brewery Bier Garten is open from April to October and it often offers live music and food vendors. Hidden Cave Cidery, opened in 2021, is a local cidery that makes cider of Wisconsin apples.

Infrastructure

Transportation
Middleton Municipal Airport (C29) serves Middleton and the surrounding communities.

A free trolley service called Middleton Trolley runs through Middleton and has 13 stops at landmarks around Middleton.

Madison's bus service Madison Metro's routes 70, 71, 72, 73, 78 and 15 all have stops throughout Middleton.

Municipal services 
The City of Middleton is served by the Middleton Police Department. The Middleton Fire Department provides fire protection services to a district consisting of the city of Middleton, as well as the neighboring Town of Middleton and portions of the towns of Springfield and Westport. The Middleton Emergency Medical Services department provides paramedic level services to the City of Middleton and the neighboring townships of Middleton and Springfield. The Middleton Public Library offers books, films, music, meeting and study spaces, Wi-Fi and programs.

Notable people 

 Matt Blanchard, NFL Quarterback 
 Gary Close, basketball coach
 Casey Cramer, football player
 Tracey DeKeyser, ice hockey coach
 Jon Erpenbach, Wisconsin State Senator
 Russ Feingold, Former United States Senator from Wisconsin
 Frank Gault, Wisconsin State Representative
 Pauline Kruger Hamilton, photographer
 Aaron Hohlbein, MLS player
 Ed Janus, journalist
 Jill Karofsky, Justice of the Wisconsin Supreme Court
 Jerry Kleczka, politician
 Paul Kowert, double bassist
 Josh Lambo, football player
 Joe Parisi, Dane County executive
 Bob Skoronski, professional football player
 Rose Schuster Taylor, writer and naturalist at Yosemite
 Otto F. Toepfer, Wisconsin State Representative
 Al Toon, football player
 Nick Toon, football player
 Edo de Waart, conductor and music director

See also 

 National Register of Historic Places listings in Dane County, Wisconsin

References

External links

 City of Middleton
 Middleton Chamber of Commerce

 
Cities in Wisconsin
Cities in Dane County, Wisconsin
Madison, Wisconsin, metropolitan statistical area